Presidential elections were held in South Vietnam on 2 October 1971. After the opposition candidates Dương Văn Minh and Nguyễn Cao Kỳ withdrew their candidacies, incumbent President Nguyễn Văn Thiệu was the only candidate, receiving 100% of the vote. Thiệu's victory in this election officially marked his second term in office. They were the last presidential elections held in South Vietnam.

Results

References

South Vietnam
Presidential elections in Vietnam
Elections in South Vietnam
Presidential elections
Single-candidate elections